In English law, a co-respondent is, in general, a respondent to a petition, or other legal proceeding, along with another or others, or a person called upon to answer in some other way.

Divorce 
More particularly, since the Matrimonial Causes Act 1857, in a petition for divorce on the ground of adultery, a co-respondent is a person charged with misconduct with the petitioner's spouse.

, alleged parties to a spouse's adultery must be made co-respondents unless they are not named in the petition or the court directs otherwise.

In practice, naming such parties in a divorce petition is discouraged as it may become a barrier to reconciliation. Such parties are only commonly named if the petitioner is seeking costs against them or has some other particular reason.

See also 
 Co-respondent shoe

References

Bibliography 
 
 

Family law
Divorce
English law
Civil procedure